American Gangster may refer to:

 Chael Sonnen (born 1977), a mixed martial artist nicknamed "The American Gangster"
 The American Gangster, a 1992 documentary on early 20th-century American gangsters
 American Gangster (film), a 2007 film by Ridley Scott, starring Russell Crowe and Denzel Washington
 American Gangster (album), a 2007 Jay-Z album inspired by the 2007 film
 American Gangster (TV series), a documentary series on the BET network

See also 
 Museum of the American Gangster